Chernivtsi Oblast, also referred to as Chernivechchyna, is an oblast (province) in Western Ukraine, consisting of the northern parts of the regions of Bukovina and Bessarabia. It has an international border with Romania and Moldova. The oblast is the smallest in Ukraine both  by area and population. Chernivtsi was part of Romania. In 1408, when it was a town in Moldavia and the chief centre of the area known as Bukovina. Chernivtsi later passed to the Turks and then in 1774 to Austria. After World War I it was ceded to Romania, and in 1940 the town was acquired by the Ukrainian SSR.

The oblast has a large variety of landforms: the Carpathian Mountains and picturesque hills at the foot of the mountains gradually change to a broad partly forested plain situated between the Dniester and Prut rivers. The region spans 8,100 km2.

Geography 
It is the smallest oblast in Ukraine, representing 1.3% of Ukrainian territory, and is only larger than the city of Kyiv itself.

In the oblast there are 75 rivers longer than 10 kilometers. The largest rivers are the Dniester (290 km, in the Oblast), Prut (128 km, in the Oblast) and Siret (113 km, in the Oblast).

The oblast covers three geographic zones: a forest steppe region between Prut and Dnister rivers, a foothill region between the Carpathian Mountains and Prut river, and a mountain region known as the Bukovinian part of the Carpathian Mountains.

Chernivtsi Oblast is bordered by Ivano-Frankivsk Oblast, Ternopil Oblast, Khmelnytskyi Oblast, Vinnytsia Oblast, Romania, and Moldova. Within the oblast the national border of Ukraine with Romania extends 226 km, and with Moldova .

History
Chernivtsi oblast was created on August 7, 1940, in the wake of the Soviet occupation of Bessarabia and Northern Bukovina. The oblast was organized out of the northeast part of Ținutul Suceava of Kingdom of Romania, joining parts of three historical regions: northern half of Bukovina, northern half of the Hotin County county of Bessarabia, and Hertsa region, which was part of the Dorohoi county (presently Botoșani County) of proper Moldavia.

Archaeological sites in the region date back to 43,000-45,000 BC, with finds including a mammoth bone dwelling from the Middle Paleolithic. The Cucuteni-Trypillian culture flourished in the area. In the Middle Ages, the region was inhabited by East Slavic tribes White Croats and Tivertsi. From the end of the 10th century, it became a part of the Kievan Rus', then Principality of Halych, and in the mid-14th century of the Principality of Moldavia (which in the 16th century became a vassal of the Ottoman Empire). In 1775, two counties of Moldavia, since then known as Bukovina, were annexed by the Habsburg monarchy as part of the Austrian Empire and its final iteration Austria-Hungary. In 1812, one half of Moldavia, since then known as Bessarabia, was annexed by the Russian Empire. Hertsa region remained in Moldavia until its union with Wallachia in 1859, a union which in 1881 became the Kingdom of Romania. In 1918 both provinces of Bukovina and Bessarabia united with the Kingdom of Romania.

The Soviet occupation began on June 28, 1940. In addition to Bessarabia, the USSR demanded Northern Bukovina as compensation for the occupation of Bessarabia by Romania from 1918 to 1940. Hertsa region was not included in the demands that the Soviet Union addressed to Romania, but was occupied at the same time. Most of the occupied territories were organized on August 2, 1940, as the Moldavian Soviet Socialist Republic, while the remainder, including the Chenivtsi Oblast, which was formed on August 7, 1940, were included in the Ukrainian Soviet Socialist Republic.

Throughout 1940-1941 several tens of thousands of Bukovinians were deported to Siberia and Kazakhstan, some 13,000 of them on June 13, 1941, alone. This and later deportations were primarily based on social class difference, it targeted intellectuals, people employed previously by the state, businessmen, clergymen, students, railworkers. The majority of those targeted were ethnic Romanians, but there were many representatives of other ethnicities, as well. The protests of the Romanian population of Bukovina that found themselves under the Soviet rule brought about serious Soviet reprisals, including of ethnic character. In the winter and spring of 1941, the Soviet troops (NKVD) opened fire on many groups of locals trying to cross the border into Romania (for more, see: Lunca massacre and Fântâna Albă massacre).

Between September 17 and November 17, 1940, by a mutual agreement between USSR and Germany, 43,641 "ethnic Germans" from the Chernivtsi region were moved to Germany, although the total ethnic German population was only 34,500, and of these some 3,500 did not go to Germany. Upon their arrival in Germany, the Nazi government sent most of non-ethnic Germans to concentration camps. Only some of them were freed after the protests of the Romanian government.

During World War II, when the region returned under the control of the Romanian administration, the Jewish community of the area was largely destroyed by the deportations to ghettos and Nazi concentration camps, where about 60% died. Despite the anti-Semitic policies of the Ion Antonescu's government of Romania, the mayor of Cernăuți, Traian Popovici, now honored by Israel's Yad Vashem memorial as one of the Righteous Among the Nations, saved approximately 20,000 Jews.

In 1944, when the Soviet troops returned to Bukovina, many inhabitants fled to Romania, and Soviet persecutions resumed, with the result that the region was seriously depopulated. In demographic terms, these war-time and post-war-time factors changed the region's ethnic composition. Today the number of Jews, Germans and Poles is negligible, while the number of Romanians has decreased substantially.

Ruthenian communities in Bukovina date back to at least 16th century. In 1775, Ukrainians (Ruthenians) represented some 8,000 out of a 75,000 population of Bukovina. By 1918, as a result of immigration of Ukrainian peasants from nearby villages in Galicia and Podolia, there were over 200,000 Ukrainians, out of a total of 730,000. Most of Ukrainians settled in the northern parts of Bukovina. Their number was especially large in the area between the Dniester and Prut rivers, where they became a majority. A similar process occurred in Northern Bessarabia. Throughout the history of the region, there were no inter-ethnic clashes, while the city of Chernivtsi was known for its German-style architecture, for a highly cultivated society, and for ethnic tolerance. Small ethnic disputes were, however, present on occasion. In 1918, many Ukrainians in Bukovina wanted to join an independent Ukrainian state. After an initial period of free education in Ukrainian language, in late 1920s Romanian authorities attempted to switch all education to the Romanian language. In 1940–1941, the Soviet reprisals were more massive in the parts of the Chernivtsi oblast were Romanians predominated; when, however, after 1944, Ukrainian anti-Soviet resistance rose up, Romanians and Ukrainians fought alongside against NKVD.

Many Ukrainians in the south-western mountain area of the Chernivtsi region belong to the Hutsul ethnic sub-group, a sophisticated cultural community inhabiting an area in the Carpathian Mountains in both Ukraine and Romania.

When the Soviet Union collapsed, Chernivtsi Oblast, then part of the Ukrainian SSR, became part of the newly independent (August 24, 1991) Ukraine. It has a Ukrainian ethnic majority. In the referendum on December 1, 1991, 92% of Chernivtsi Oblast residents supported the independence of Ukraine, a wide support from both Ukrainians and Romanians.

Subdivisions 

Since July 2020, Chernivtsi Oblast is administratively subdivided into 3 raions (districts). These are

Chernivtsi Raion;
Dnistrovskyi Raion;
Vyzhnytsia Raion.

At the locality level, the territory of the oblast is divided among 11 cities, 8 urban-type settlements, and 252 communes.

Urban settlements

Population and demographics

According to the latest Ukrainian Census (2001), Ukrainians represent about 75% (689.1 thousands) of the population of Chernivtsi Oblast. 12.5% (114.6 thousands) reported themselves as Romanians, 7.3% (67.2 thousand) as Moldovans, and 4.1% (37.9 thousands) as Russians. The other nationalities, such as Poles, Belarusians, and Jews sum up to 1.2%.

The separate categories for the Moldovans and Romanians as two ethnicities has been criticized by Romanian organizations in Ukraine. However, all census respondents had to write in their ethnicity (no predetermined set of choices existed), and could respond or not to any particular census question, or not answer any questions at all. Also, no allegation of counting fraud were brought up. However, Interregional Union, one of Romanian communities in Ukraine criticized what they see as the continuous usage of Romanians and Moldovans as two separate ethnic groups.

According to the Romanian census of 1930, the territory of the future Chernivtsi Oblast had 805,642 inhabitants in that year, out of which 47.6% were Ukrainians, and 28.2% were Romanians. The rest of the population was 88,772 Jews, 46,946 Russians (among them an important community of Lipovans), around 35,000 Germans, 10,000 Poles, and 10,000 Hungarians.

During the inter-war period, Cernăuți County had a population of 306,975, of which 136,380 were Ukrainians, and 78,589 were Romanians. Storojineţ County had 77,382 Ukrainians and 57,595 Romanians. (The three other counties of Bukovina, which remained in Romania, had a total of 22,368 Ukrainians). The northern part of the Hotin County had approximately 70% Ukrainians and 25% Romanians. The Hertsa region, smaller by area and population, was virtually 100% Romanian.

Major demographic changes occurred during the Second World War. Immediate after the Soviet takeover of the region in 1940 the Soviet government deported or killed about 41,000 Romanians (see Fântâna Albă massacre), while at the same time further encouraging an influx of Ukrainians from the Ukrainian SSR. Most Poles were deported by the Soviet authorities, while most Germans forcibly returned to Germany. After the Kingdom of Romania took control of the region during the war (1941–1944), the Jewish community of the area was largely destroyed by the deportations to ghettos and concentration camps.

The languages of the population closely reflect the ethnic composition with over 90% within each of the major ethnic groups declaring their national language as the mother tongue.

Age structure
 0-14 years: 16.7%  (male 77,507/female 73,270)
 15-64 years: 69.7%  (male 304,793/female 325,677)
 65 years and over: 13.6%  (male 41,980/female 80,871) (2013 official)

Median age
 total: 36.9 years 
 male: 34.5 years 
 female: 39.4 years  (2013 official)

Attractions

On the territory of the Chernivtsi region there are 836 archeological monuments (of which 18 have national meanings), 586 historical monuments (2 of them have national significance), 779 monuments of architecture and urban development (112 of them national significance), 42 monuments of monumental art.

Residence of Bukovinian and Dalmatian Metropolitans, UNESCO World Heritage Site
Khotyn Fortress State historical-architectural preserve
House of Olha Kobylianska
Caves of Oleksa Dovbush
 Chernivtsi architectural complex of Olha Kobylianska Street
 Several archaeological sites of the Trajan's Wall
 Church of the Nativity of The Most Holy Theotokos in Rukhotyn

Notable people 
 Konstantin Popovich, Ukrainian and Moldovan writer and academician

References

External links
Chernivtsi Oblast Administration (official website) 
Chernivtsi Oblast Council (official website) 
Statistics Committee of Chernivtsi Oblast

See also
List of Canadian place names of Ukrainian origin

 
Oblasts of Ukraine
Bukovina
Romanian-speaking countries and territories
States and territories established in 1940
1940 establishments in Ukraine